Central Mahachai (เซ็นทรัล มหาชัย), previously known as CentralPlaza Mahachai,  is a shopping mall and department store in Mueang Samut Sakhon District (Mahachai), Samut Sakhon Province, on the southern outskirts of Bangkok, Thailand.

It can be considered as another shopping mall in the Central Pattana network in the vicinity besides CentralPlaza Rama II in Bang Khun Thian area.

Its highlight is its location on the route between Bangkok and the south (Rama II Road), regarded as rest stop on its own and centre of various Thai foods especially seafood.

The mall opened in 2017 with more than 300 stores. It has a gross floor area of 170,000 m2 (1,829,864.87 sq ft). The building is designed in the concept of harbour and fisherman settlement, Samut Sakhon's identity.

The total cost of the shopping complex was 4.75 billion baht.

Anchors 
Robinson
Tops (Old Tops Superstore Market)
Power Buy
SuperSports
B2S
OfficeMate
Food Park
Eatalay
Sam Samut (Outdoor Market)
Uniqlo
SF Cinema 6 Cinemas

Cites

External links 

Shopping malls in Thailand
Central Pattana
Shopping malls established in 2017
2017 establishments in Thailand
Buildings and structures in Samut Sakhon Province